EAO may refer to:
 East African Orogeny
 East Asian Observatory
 Enefit American Oil
 Ethnic Armed Organisations
 European Association for Osseointegration
 Ford EAO engine